The term bleeding milkcap is used to describe at least two mushrooms of the genus Lactarius:

Lactarius rubrilacteus 
Lactarius sanguifluus